The men's singles of the 2020 RPM Open tournament took place on clay in Prague, Czech Republic.

This was the first edition of the tournament.

Aslan Karatsev won the title after defeating Tallon Griekspoor 6–4, 7–6(8–6) in the final.

Seeds
All seeds receive a bye into the second round.

Draw

Finals

Top half

Section 1

Section 2

Bottom half

Section 3

Section 4

References

External links
Main draw
Qualifying draw

2020 ATP Challenger Tour